Moros is a genus of tyrannosauroid theropod that lived during the Late Cretaceous period in what is now Utah, United States. It contains a single species, M. intrepidus. Moros represents one of the earliest known diagnostic tyrannosauroid material from the North America.

Discovery and naming

Moros was first discovered at the Stormy Theropod site located in Emery County in the U.S. state of Utah. Palaeontologists had been researching the area for ten years when in 2013 limb bones were seen jutting out of a hillside, prompting the excavation. The bones were described as of a new species in February, 2019.

In 2019, the type species Moros intrepidus was named and described by Lindsay E. Zanno, Ryan T. Tucker, Aurore Canoville, Haviv M. Avrahami, Terry A. Gates and
Peter J. Makovicky. The generic name is derived from the Greek Moros (an embodiment of impending doom), in reference to the establishment of the tyrannosauroid lineage in North America. The specific name is the Latin word intrepidus ("intrepid"), referring to the hypothesized dispersal of tyrannosauroids throughout North America following Moros.

The holotype, NCSM 33392, was found in the lower Mussentuchit Member of the Cedar Mountain Formation dating from the Cenomanian. The layer has a maximimum age of 96.4 million years. The holotype consists of a right hindlimb. It contains the thighbone, the shinbone, the second and fourth metatarsal and the third and fourth phalanx of the fourth toe. LAGs (Lines of arrested growth) indicate that it represents a subadult individual of six or seven years old, nearing its maximum size. Additionally, two premaxillary teeth were referred to the species, specimens NCSM 33393 and NCSM 33276.

Description
 
The foot bones of Moros were extremely slender, with metatarsal proportions found to be more similar to ornithomimids than to other Late Cretaceous tyrannosauroids.

Classification
In their phylogenetic analyses, Zanno and colleagues in 2019 recovered Moros as a basal pantyrannosaurian alongside Asian taxa from the middle of the Cretaceous such as Xiongguanlong and Timurlengia. This phylogenetic affinity with Asian basal tyrannosauroids suggests that Moros was part of a transcontinental exchange between the biotas of Asia and North America during the mid-Cretaceous that is well-documented in other taxa.

See also
 Timeline of tyrannosaur research

References

Early Cretaceous dinosaurs of North America
Tyrannosaurs
Fossil taxa described in 2019